

Missouri state forests

See also
 List of national forests of the United States

Missouri